{|
{{Infobox ship image
|Ship image=Selma (steamship) circa 1913.jpg
|Ship caption=Chasina as Selma, circa 1913.}}

|}Chasina was an iron-hulled, steam-powered ship, originally built as a steam yacht, but later converted to a passenger-freighter vessel that served in coastal British Columbia and other areas during the early decades of the 1900s  under the ownership several different companies.  The ship disappeared in 1931 after leaving Hong Kong.

NomenclatureChasina was named after Chasina Island, which is in the Okisollo Channel west of Maurelle Island on the coast of British Columbia.  The actual meaning of "chasina", a word from the First Nations is unknown.

Design and constructionChasina was built in 1881 by  John Elder & Co.  The steel -hulled clipper-bowed ship originally was launched on November 3, 1881 as the steam yacht Santa Cecilia for a wealthy member of Parliament from a prominent family, Alfred Paget.Some sources state that this vessel was built for the Marquis of Anglesea, who would have been the brother of Alfred Paget.  This appears to be an error.  All contemporary sources indicate that Alfred Paget, whose wife was named Cecilia, was the owner of Lady Cecilia. (1816-1888). The vessel was built at Govan, Scotland, at the Fairfield yard of John Elder & Co.

The ship was 141.8 feet long, with a beam of 22.1 feet and depth of hold of 11.6 feet.  As a yacht, the ship's tonnage was calculated at 300 tons, using a special yacht tonnage measurement.  As a commercial ship, the vessel was rated at 258 gross tons and 159 registered tons.  For operations on coastal British Columbia, Chasina was licensed to carry 200 passengers in summer and 153 in the winter.

The vessel had a maximum speed of 13.5 knots, but generally proceeded as an average speed of 11.5 knots.

As built, the yacht was equipped with compound steam engines.  The high-pressure cylinder had a bore diameter of 18 inches, with the low-pressure cylinder having a 36-inch bore.  The stroke length on both cylinders was 21 inches.  A single boiler was installed by the builders, which supplied steam to the engines at 100 pounds pressure.

Yacht career
During the ship's career as the yacht Santa Cecilia, a number of notable guests were hosted on board, including King Edward VII and Lillie Langtry.

Transfer to Vancouver
In 1910 the ship was brought to the coast of British Columbia under Capt. Charles Polkinghome from the South Pacific.  The ship was then purchased by the All Red shipping line, and renamed Selma.  The official Canadian registry number was 85075.

Polkinghome continued in command of the vessel under the All Red line, which used the ship to serve a route out of Vancouver to Powell River in conjunction with another former steam yacht, the Santa Maria, renamed Chilco in Union service.   One ship would start at Vancouver at 9:30 am and the other would start at Powell River, usually passing at Sechelt, where both ships called.  Along the way, they stopped at a number of small landings, such as Roberts Creek, Pender Harbour, Stillwater, and Myrtle Point.

Union Steamship career
In 1917, the All Red line and all of its ships and assets were purchased by the Union Steamship Company of British Columbia.  Selma was then renamed Chasina.Newell, ed., McCurdy Marine History, at page 289.

Later service
In 1923, Union Steamship decided to sell Chasina to make room for newer vessels which were then being brought into service.Henry, The Good Company, at pages 99-100 and 103.  Chasina was then reputed to have been used as a rum runner.   On September 6, 1931, the ship departed Hong Kong and was never seen again.

 Notes 

 References 
 Henry, Tom, The Good Company – An Affectionate History of the Union Steamships, Harbour Publishing, Madeira Park, BC (1994) 
 Newell, Gordon R., ed. H.W. McCurdy Marine History of the Pacific Northwest, Superior Publishing, Seattle WA (1966).
 Rushton, Gerald A., Whistle up the Inlet – The Union Steamship Story, J.J. Douglas, Vancouver, BC (1974).
 Rushton, Gerald A., Echoes of the Whistle - An Illustrated History of the Union Steamship Company'', Douglas & McIntyre, Vancouver, BC (1980) 

1881 ships
Steamships of Canada
Union Steamship Company of British Columbia
Ships built in Govan
Steam yachts